Church of Saint Katherine of Alexandria may refer to:

Church of Saint Catherine of Alexandria, Topoľčianky, Slovakia
Church of Saint Katherine of Alexandria (Rosina), Slovakia